The 2007 Jim Beam 400 was the eighth round of the 2007 V8 Supercar season. It was held on the weekend of the 17 to 19 August at Oran Park Raceway in New South Wales. Lee Holdsworth won the round for Garry Rogers Motorsport. The round was also significant as it was the debut weekend of the 2016 champion Shane van Gisbergen.

Results

Qualifying

Race 1 results

Race 2 results

Race 3 results

External links
 Oran Park Raceway website

Jim Beam 400